Charles Warren (19 March 1764 – 12 August 1829) was an English barrister and politician, judge and amateur cricketer.

Life
A son of Richard Warren, and nephew of John Warren, he was brother to John Warren the Dean of Bangor, Pelham Warren the physician, and Frederick Warren; and so uncle to John's children Sir Charles Warren, and John Warren the mathematician. He was educated at Westminster School and Jesus College, Cambridge, which he entered in 1780, matriculating in 1784, and graduating B.A. in 1785, M.A. in 1788. He was a Fellow of Jesus College, from 1786 to 1813. Entering Lincoln's Inn in 1781, he was called to the bar in 1790. He was elected a Fellow of the Royal Society in 1790.

In 1792, Warren signed a declaration by the Society of the Friends of the People. He was called as a defence witness in the 1798 trial of Sackville Tufton, 9th Earl of Thanet.

Legal career
An Old Bailey barrister, Warren also took up a bankruptcy commission. He was chancellor to the diocese of Bangor from 1797, for the rest of his life.

Warren was made King's Counsel in 1816. He was appointed Chief Justice of Chester in 1819, and was the last to hold the post: between his death in 1829, and the abolition of the position by the Law Terms Act 1830, the functions were carried out by Thomas Jervis his junior, as Puisne Justice of Chester. In April 1820 he presided over the sedition trial of Sir Charles Wolseley, 7th Baronet and Joseph Harrison, sitting with Samuel Marshall.

Political career
An English judge could not sit in the House of Commons; but the situation for a Welsh judge was otherwise. This and other differences in the judicatures were under debate in parliament from the time he took up his post as Chief Justice of Chester, Warren defending the status quo.

The political patron at Dorchester who brought Warren in as a candidate in 1819 was Cropley Ashley-Cooper, 6th Earl of Shaftesbury, known as a supporter of the Tory administration of Lord Liverpool. Warren was not opposed in the general election of 1820 caused by the death of George III. His reputation, as "ageing and discredited", had slumped, and there was some expectation that he would retire in 1824, when John Leslie Foster was waiting in the wings. He left it to the general election of 1826, however.

Legacy
Papers concerning the Chester Circuit went in 1847, after Warren's death, to the Public Record Office. Peter Stafford Carey and David Williams transferred the papers after Amelia Warren had also died.

Family
Warren married Amelia Sloper of Sundridge, Kent on 9 July 1813, at the house of Lady Jones in South Audley Street, London.

Cricket
As a keen amateur cricketer, Warren was mainly associated with Middlesex teams.  He played for the Gentlemen in the inaugural Gentlemen v Players match in 1806, and made 33 known appearances in first-class cricket matches from 1795 to 1826.

Along with John Tanner, Warren was the last 18th century player to retire from first-class cricket, in his case at the age of 62.

References

1764 births
1829 deaths
Cricketers from Greater London
People educated at Westminster School, London
Alumni of Jesus College, Cambridge
Members of Lincoln's Inn
Fellows of Jesus College, Cambridge
Fellows of the Royal Society
English cricketers
English cricketers of 1787 to 1825
English cricketers of 1826 to 1863
Gentlemen cricketers
Middlesex cricketers
Hampshire cricketers
Marylebone Cricket Club cricketers
Sussex cricketers
Epsom cricketers
Non-international England cricketers
Gentlemen of England cricketers
E. H. Budd's XI cricketers
Old Wykehamists cricketers
British sportsperson-politicians
Members of the Parliament of the United Kingdom for English constituencies
UK MPs 1818–1820
UK MPs 1820–1826
Politicians from London
Marylebone Cricket Club and Homerton cricketers